The 1928 United States presidential election in Washington took place on November 6, 1928 as part of the 1928 United States presidential election. Washington's voters selected seven voters to the Electoral College, who voted for president and vice president.

With the economy growing very rapidly, and the scandals of the earlier decade such as the Teapot Dome scandal essentially removed from the public's mind at the time, the Republican Party was at the peak of its power. Incumbent President Calvin Coolidge could not be persuaded to run for a second full term, but to compensate for this the Democratic Party – with many prominent members like Franklin Delano Roosevelt and William Gibbs McAdoo refusing to run because they believed the party had no hope of winning – nominated Al Smith, a devout Catholic, anti-Prohibition, and associated with the corrupt Tammany Hall political machine of his native New York.

The powerful anti-Catholicism of the Pacific Northwest, which was largely settled by Scandinavians, meant that the large progressive third-party vote for Parley Christensen and Robert La Follette from the previous two elections was mainly turned over to Hoover, although La Follette when he died in 1925 had endorsed Smith. Minus significant third-party candidates Smith did triple the Democratic vote from the exceptionally low level of 1924, but Hoover increased the Republican proportion by fifteen percent – half the La Follette vote – as Smith could not carry the strongly unionized and socially progressive counties west of the Cascades.

Consequently, Hoover was able to carry Washington by 36 percentage points in the first two-party contest in three elections. With 67.06% of the popular vote, Washington would prove to be Hoover's fourth strongest state after Kansas, Michigan and Maine. Only in 1904 has Washington State been so Republican relative to the nation as a whole, and then there was a sizable Socialist vote (though less powerful than the third-party votes of 1920 and 1924) for Eugene Debs. Smith did nonetheless carry Ferry County, the first time since 1916 the Democratic Party had won any county in Washington – and indeed along with five counties in California the first Democratic wins since that election in any county within the three Pacific States of Washington, Oregon and California.

Until Donald Trump in 2016, Hoover was the last Republican to capture heavily unionized Grays Harbor County, which he did by a large 34 percent margin. He was also the last Republican to win a majority in this county until Trump in 2020. Hoover also won adjacent Pacific County by 36 percent, whereas only Dwight D. Eisenhower in 1952 managed to subsequently win Pacific County for the GOP until Trump in 2016. Kitsap, Snohomish and Wahkiakum Counties would not vote Republican again until 1972.

Results

Results by county

See also
 United States presidential elections in Washington (state)
 Presidency of Herbert Hoover

Notes

References

Washington
1928
1928 Washington (state) elections